Charles Cochrane (1835 Dudley, Worcestershire – 1898) was a British engineer. He was a leading authority on blast furnaces.
He secured a patent for dehumidifying air.

Life
In 1850, he studied at King's College London.  
He worked with Samuel Holden Blackwell, at Russell's Hall Iron Works, and other blast-furnaces, mills and forges.

His father, Alexander Brodie Cochrane, was the owner of Woodside Iron Works.
In 1855, he went to the Ormesby Iron Works.  In 1856, he became a partner with his father.

The Woodside Iron Works supplied many important structures, including the Holborn Viaduct, Westminster Bridge, Cannon Street Railway Bridge, Charing Cross railway station, and the Runcorn Railway Bridge.  
They helped relocate the Hungerford Suspension Bridge from the Thames to the Clifton Suspension Bridge at Bristol.

References

External links

1835 births
1898 deaths
Alumni of King's College London
People from Dudley
Engineers from the West Midlands (county)